Club Deportivo Pasaquina Futbol Club, commonly known as Pasaquina F.C. are a Salvadoran professional football club based in Pasaquina, La Unión Department.

They currently play in the Salvadoran Primera División.

History

Pasaquina came close to being promoted to the Primera División in 1996, but they lost a round-robin tournament to Chalatenango and Metapan.

The club won the 2013 Apertura. The club failed to win the 2014 Clausura title, which meant the club were forced to play in a promotion play-off against Once Lobos over two Legs, which Pasaquina won 2–1. The win allowed the club to be promoted to the Primera División for the first time in their history.

On 3 July 2019, Pasaquina failed to meet the requirements that FESFUT had placed for clubs to be eligible to play in the Primera División by failing to pay outstanding debts. The club will be forced to sell their spot in Primera División.

Stadium

 Estadio San Sebastian; Pasaquina (2005–2018)
 Estadio Jose Ramon Flores; Santa Rosa de Lima (2014) 1 game in Primera División
 Estadio Marcelino Imbers, La Unión, El Salvador (2018–present)

Pasaquina currently plays their home games at Estadio Marcelino Imbers in La Union, due to low attendance and meeting the Primera División's new footballing standards. The club previously played their home games at Estadio San Sebastián in Pasaquina. Pasaquina have occasionally held home games at Estadio Jose Ramon Flores in Santa Rosa de Lima.

Current squad

Out on loan

In

Out

Reserve League squad
Pasaquina's reserve squad plays in the twelve-team Primera División Reserves (El Salvador). Current members of the squad are:

List of coaches
 Thomas Good López
 Geovanni Portillo
 Jose Ramon Aviles
 David Ramírez (2010–12)
 Esteban Melara (2013–13)
 David Ramírez (2013 – June 14)
 Jorge García (July 2014 – Dec 14)
 Juan Andrés Sarulyte (Dec 2014 – May 15)
 Víctor Coreas (June 2015 – Dec 15)
 Hugo Ovelar (Dec 2015 – Dec 2016)
 Omar Sevilla (Jan 2017 – Sep 2017)
 Manuel Carranza Murillo (Sep 2017 – Feb 2018)
 Francisco Robles (interim) (Feb 2018 – June 2018)
 Eraldo Correia (June 2018 – Feb 2019)
 Jose Manuel Romero (Feb 2019 -June 2019)

Former players
The following list includes players that have appeared in at least 100 league games and/or have reached international status.
 Moisés Hernández
 Emerson Véliz
 Kordell Samuel
 Leston Paul
 Isidro Gutiérrez
  Nicolás Muñoz
 Javier Lezcano
 Devaughn Elliott

International capped players

Champion of scoring per season

Best Scorer

Player records

Top goalscorers

Note: Players in bold text are still active with Pasaquina

References

External links
 Ceroacero page for Pasaquina F.C.

Football clubs in El Salvador
Association football clubs established in 1962
1962 establishments in El Salvador